Cell Proliferation is a monthly open-access online-only scientific journal covering cell biology. It was established in 1968 as Cell and Tissue Kinetics, obtaining its current title in 1991. It is published by John Wiley & Sons and the editor-in-chief is Q. Zhou (Chinese Academy of Sciences). According to the Journal Citation Reports, the journal has a 2021 impact factor of 8.755, ranking it 42nd out of 194 journals in the category "Cell Biology".

References

External links

Molecular and cellular biology journals
Publications established in 1968
Wiley (publisher) academic journals
English-language journals
Monthly journals
Online-only journals
Open access journals